The Men's 15 kilometre freestyle competition at the FIS Nordic World Ski Championships 2021 was held on 3 March. A qualification was held on 24 February 2021.

Results

Final
The final was started on 3 March at 13:15.

Qualification
The qualification was started on 24 February at 10:30.

References

Men's 15 kilometre freestyle